Sampit is a city located in East Kotawaringin Regency, Central Kalimantan. Previously a timber port town, it has grown to be a medium-sized city with a population of 166,773 according to Statistics Indonesia in 2019, with the economy having since divested from timber products. However, the city is not an autonomous city and not an administrative division by despite having a sizeable population and urban built-up. The city consists of 11 subdistricts from Baamang district, Seranau district, and Mentawa Baru Ketapang district. The total area of the city is 751.45 square kilometers.

Etymology 
The origin of the city name is disputed. The name is thought to be derived from Chinese. 31 Chinese laborers worked for a plantation in the city during the colonial era, with "sam-it" roughly meaning 31.

History

Early History 
The region was previously thought to be under a tribal kingdom founded by Dayak Ot Danum people between the 13th and 14th century although the existence of the kingdom is disputed. The region became part of the Sultanate of Banjar in the early 16th century. The region was ceded to the Dutch East Indies by Sultan Adam of Banjar on 4 May 1826.

Modern History 

During World War II, the city came under control of the Imperial Japanese Navy together with Banjarmasin. The Proclamation of Indonesian Independence was made by Indonesian nationalist in the city through radio and a Japanese newspaper Borneo Shimbun between September & October 1945. Unlike most of cities in Kalimantan which have been liberated by Allied forces of Australia, Sampit remained under Japanese control until 1946. Conflict between Indonesian nationalist and newly arrived Dutch troops continues until 1949.

Sampit became known worldwide following inter-ethnic violent communal clashes between the Dayaks and the Madurese migrants during the Sampit conflict which broke out on February 17, 2001 and lasted for 10 days. There are a number of stories purportedly describing the incident that sparked the violence in 2001. One version claims that it was caused by an arson attack on a Dayak house. Rumours spread that the fire was caused by Madurese, and later a group of Dayaks began burning houses in a Madurese neighbourhood. Another version says that the massacre was triggered by an earlier incident in December 2000 when a Dayak man was killed by three Madurese. The clash was also thought to be triggered by perceived threat of Madurese economically dominating Dayaks, although this is not proven. The conflict has been described by Inside Indonesia as an "ethnic fascism". Central & local government did little to stop the violence and some of army generals & politicians of Dayak-descendant decided to use the violence to gain power.

Climate
Sampit has a tropical rainforest climate (Af) with heavy rainfall year-round.

Infrastructure

Transportation 
The city has total 474 kilometers of road, mostly have been paved with asphalt. However, due to lack of enforcement of trucks weight moving on the road, around 18% of the roads are considered lightly to moderately damaged.

River transportation is an important part of city's life, both inter-city and to other cities such as Banjarmasin. Port of Sampit in Mentaya is used for both container and passenger. However, due to the river's relatively shallow depth, loading container in the port is dangerous and often caused the crane to damage parks, statues, and buildings around the port. Importance of the port for container and movement of goods have been reduced and now mostly used for passenger transportation only. Angkots, while have presence in the city, has been in sharp decline due to competition with ride-hailing online app services such as Gojek and Grab. In addition, there's also a local online ride-hailing application exclusive to the city named Pas-Jek. Other alternatives include bemo and rickshaw.

The city is served by H. Asan Airport.

Health & Education 
City's main hospital, Dr. Murjani Sampit Regional Hospital is located in Mentawa Baru Hilir which on 2018 undergo a major expansion. New four-stories building for the hospital was inaugurated in January 2021. There's one university in the city, Darwan Ali University, which is a private university. Several other higher education institutions such as Sampit Economy College and Teaching & Education College of Muhammadiyah also present in the city.

Others 
Convenience store chains such as Indomaret have presence in the city. Other than that, there's also shopping malls in the city such as Borneo City Mall and Mentaya Shopping Center.

References 

Populated places in Central Kalimantan
Regency seats of Central Kalimantan
Cities in Indonesia
East Kotawaringin Regency